Mohammadyar (also Romanized as Moḩammadyār, Moḩammad Yār, and Muhammadiar) is a Kurdish and Azerbaijani city in, and the capital of, Mohammadyar District of Naqadeh County, West Azerbaijan province, Iran. At the 2006 census, its population was 8,018 in 1,953 households. The following census in 2011 counted 8,604 people in 2,423 households. The latest census in 2016 showed a population of 9,313 people in 2,775 households.

References 

Naqadeh County

Cities in West Azerbaijan Province

Populated places in West Azerbaijan Province

Populated places in Naqadeh County